The Dream class is a series of 5 container ships built for HMM. The ships have a maximum theoretical capacity of 13,154 TEU. The ships were built by Daewoo Shipbuilding and Marine Engineering in South Korea.

List of ships

See also 
HMM Algeciras-class container ship
HMM Nuri-class container ship
Hyundai Together-class container ship
Hyundai Earth-class container ship

References 

Container ship classes
Ships built by Daewoo Shipbuilding & Marine Engineering